Scobinți is a commune in Iași County, Western Moldavia, Romania. It is composed of five villages: Bădeni, Fetești, Scobinți, Sticlăria and Zagavia.

References

Communes in Iași County
Localities in Western Moldavia